The red-rumped bush tyrant (Cnemarchus erythropygius) is a species of bird in the family Tyrannidae. It is found in Bolivia, Colombia, Ecuador, and Peru.
Its natural habitats are subtropical or tropical moist montane forests and subtropical or tropical high-altitude grassland.

Description
It has a narrow beak and distinctive colouring. The fore crown is white dappled with grey, and the hind-crown and nape are grey. There is an indistinct pale streak above the eye. The back, mantle, wings and tail are slatey-brown, with the rump and base of the outer tail feathers rufous. There are two white streaks on the wings. The throat is streaked in grey and white, the breast is grey and the belly rufous.

Distribution and habitat
The red-rumped bush tyrant is native to mountainous regions in South America. Its range includes the Sierra Nevada de Santa Marta  and in the Andes in Norte de Santander Department and Cundinamarca State in northern and central Colombia, and the mountains of Ecuador, eastern Peru and western Bolivia.

Status
This bird has a very large range, the population is stable and no particular threats have been identified, so the International Union for Conservation of Nature has assessed its conservation status as being of least concern.

References

red-rumped bush tyrant
Birds of the Northern Andes
red-rumped bush tyrant
red-rumped bush tyrant
Taxonomy articles created by Polbot